The Poonch District is one of the 10 districts of Pakistan-administered territory of Azad Kashmir. It is bounded on the north by Bagh District, on the north-east by Haveli District, on the south-east by the Poonch District of Indian-administered Kashmir, on the south by Azad Kashmir's Sudhanoti and Kotli districts, and on the west by Rawalpindi District of Pakistan's Punjab Province. The Poonch District is part of the greater Kashmir dispute between India and Pakistan. The district headquarters is the city of Rawalakot. It is the 3rd most populus district of Azad Kashmir.

The main language is Pahari ("Punchi"), native to an estimated 95% of the population, but there are also speakers of Gujari, while Urdu has official status.

History

17th Century to 1946 

From the end of seventeenth century up to 1837 CE, Poonch was ruled by the Muslim rajas of Loran in Haveli Tehsil.  It then fell into the hands of Raja Faiztalab of the Punjab government.  Poonch was included in the transfer of the hilly country to Maharaja Gulab Singh  of Jammu and Kashmir in 1848.  Before this transfer, Poonch was a jagir granted to Raja Dhian Singh.  Maharaja Gulab Singh reinstated Poonch and adjoining areas to Dhian Singh's sons, Jawahar Singh and Moiti Singh. The raja of Poonch had to present to the Maharaja one horse with gold trappings.  The raja of Poonch was not permitted to effect any administrative changes in the territory of Poonch without prior consultation with the Maharaja of Kashmir.

Separation of Poonch

After independence in 1947, there was a rebellion in the western part of the Poonch District. The rebels led by Sardar Ibrahim Khan, sought support from the Dominion of Pakistan, which provided arms and then launched an invasion of its own, using Pashtun tribals. In response, the Maharaja of Jammu and Kashmir joined India, and the conflict turned into an Indo-Pakistani war. When a ceasefire was effected, the Poonch District was divided into two separate districts. The former headquarters, the city of Poonch, came under Indian administration, and a new headquarters in the western district was eventually established at Rawalakot.

1949 to Present 
Of the four tehsils of the original Poonch District, viz., Bagh, Sudhnoti, Haveli, and Mendhar, the Azad Kashmiri Poonch Division included the first two and a portion of the third. Those three tehsils were eventually made separate districts, and a new Poonch District was created in the center of the Poonch Division by  incorporating portions of the Bagh and Sudhnoti tehsils.

Poonch district was the main area of violent anti government revolt (led by the Sudhan tribe) during the 1955 Poonch uprising, which lasted from early 1955 to late 1956.

Administrative divisions
The district is administratively subdivided into four tehsils:

Abbaspur Tehsil
Hajira Tehsil
Rawalakot Tehsil
Thorar Tehsil

Education 

According to the Pakistan District Education Ranking 2017, a report released by Alif Ailaan, the Poonch District is ranked at number 8 nationally, with an education score of 73.52. Over the past five years, the Poonch District has shown the most improvement in the establishment  of middle schools. The learning score for the Poonch District is 84.15. The school infrastructure score for the Poonch District is 14.88, ranking the district at number 151, which places it in the bottom five districts relating to infrastructure in Pakistan and its two dependent territories. Schools in the Poonch District also have severe problems with regard to electricity, drinking water, and boundary walls, as reflected in their scores of 2.67, 12.1, and 6.23, respectively. The state of some school buildings also presents a major safety risk for students.

Transport

The Poonch-Rawalakot bus, which crosses the LOC, has helped to re-establish ties across the border.

See also
History of Poonch District
Poonch district, India
1947 Poonch Rebellion
Poonch Medical College Rawalakot

References

Bibliography

External links 

Official website of the Government of Azad Kashmir

 
Districts of Azad Kashmir